Cliff Bergere (December 6, 1896 Toledo, Ohio – June 18, 1980 Dade City, Florida) was an American stuntman and racecar driver.

Bergere did stunt driving for movies, including the 1923 film The Eagle's Talons, before embarking on a racing career. From 1927 to 1947, he started the Indianapolis 500 sixteen times, missing only the 1930 race. He started the race from the front row three times and won the pole in 1946. At age 49, he was the oldest pole winner ever. He finished third in 1932 and 1939 and completed the 1941 race without making a pit stop, finishing fifth.

Bergere had the distinction of the most starts in Indy 500 history at the time of his career (16), a record he held until 1974.

Indianapolis 500 results

References

External links
Cliff Bergere and Americas Safest Tire
The Greatest 33: Cliff Bergere

Indy 500 history: Cliff Bergere
Racing-Reference page

1896 births
1980 deaths
AAA Championship Car drivers
Indianapolis 500 drivers
Indianapolis 500 polesitters
Racing drivers from Ohio
Sportspeople from Toledo, Ohio